Dum Dum Park (Bengali:দমদম পার্ক) is a locality in South Dumdum of North 24 Parganas district in the Indian state of West Bengal. It is a part of area covered by Kolkata Metropolitan Development Authority (KMDA) . Dum Dum Park is a planned area with straight and wide roads, multiple water tanks have become a coveted neighbourhood in Greater Kolkata. In recent years, the multiple high budget  Durga Puja pandals  of Kolkata draw several visitors to the area during the Durga Puja.

Transport

Metro
Belgachia metro station and Dum Dum metro station are the two nearby metro stations from Dum Dum Park.Under construction Biman Bandar metro station/(Airport Metro Station) and Jessore Road metro station  are also a nearby metro station from Dum Dum Park.

Train
Bidhannagar Road railway station, Patipukur railway station, Kolkata Station and Dum Dum Junction are the railway stations close to Dum Dum Park. Howrah Station is the major railway station which is at a distance of 11 km from Dum Dum Park. Sealdah Station is another major railway station which is at a distance of 8.5 km from Dum Dum Park.

Bus
Buses ply along Jessore Road and VIP Road here.

WBTC Bus
 C14/1 Madhyamgram - Tollygunge
 S37 Barasat - Garia
 AC37 Barasat - Garia
 AC39 Kolkata Airport - Howrah Station
 AC40 Kolkata Airport - Howrah Maidan
 AC50 Belur Math - Garia
 AC50A Rajchandrapur - Garia
 V1 Kolkata Airport - Kudghat
 VS1 Kolkata Airport - Esplanade
 VS2 Kolkata Airport - Howrah Station
 D-23 Esplanade - Kaijuri Bazar

Private Bus
 3C/1 Nagerbazar - Anandapur
 3C/2 Nagerbazar - Anandapur
 12C/2 Dum Dum Park/Aquatica - Howrah station
 30C Hatiara - Babughat
 30C/1 Hatiara - Babughat
 30D Dum Dum Cantonment railway station - Babughat
 44 Baguiati - Howrah Station
 44/1 Baguiati - Howrah Station
 45 Kolkata Airport - Baishnabghata Patuli
 46 Kolkata Airport - Esplanade
 46B New Town Akanksha Moonbeam - Esplanade
 79B Barasat - Bagbazar
 79D Madhyamgram - Babughat
 91 Bhangar Kanthalia - Shyambazar
 91A Haroa - Shyambazar
 91C Lauhati - Shyambazar
 93 Kharibari - Bagbazar
 211 Kharibari/Patharghata - Ahiritola
 211A Langolpota - Ahiritola
 211B Ganraguri - Ahiritola
 215 New Town Akanksha Moonbeam - Howrah Station
 217 Beraberi - Babughat
 217A Narayanpur - Babughat
 217B Bablatala - Babughat
 219 Nagerbazar - Howrah Station
 221 Nagerbazar - Golpark
 223 B.T. College - Golf Green
 227 Bangur Avenue - BNR Colony
 237 Birati Tantkal - Babughat
 253 Basirhat - Esplanade
 KB16 Bangur Avenue - New Town Shapoorji Housing Estate
 KB21 Ganganagar - Science City
 DN8 Barasat - Salt Lake Karunamoyee 
 DN16/1 Barasat - Dhamakhali
 DN18 Shyambazar - Baduria

Mini Bus
 S138 Kolkata Airport - Jadavpur
 S151 Kolkata Airport - B.B.D. Bagh
 S152 Baguiati - B.B.D. Bagh
 S172 Teghoria Haldirams - Howrah Maidan
 S184 Birati railway station - B.B.D. Bagh

Air
The Netaji Subhash Chandra Bose International Airport,Kolkata is at a distance of about 5.3 kilometres from Dum Dum Park.

List of Major Roads
 VIP Road
  Jessore Road

Shyambazar Five Point Crossing is at a distance of 4.2 kilometres from Dum Dum Park More.

Shopping
Diamond Plaza  mall one of the major shopping area around North kolkata and Kolkata Metropolitan Area including Dum Dum locality.

Medical Facilities
 ILS Hospitals Dum Dum, one of the renowned multispeciality hospitals in the Kolkata Metropolitan Area, is located around 2.2 kilometres from Dum Dum Park.
 The Apollo Clinic

References

Cities and towns in North 24 Parganas district
Neighbourhoods in North 24 Parganas district
Neighbourhoods in Kolkata
Kolkata Metropolitan Area